The men's coxed four competition at the 1948 Summer Olympics in London took place at Henley-on-Thames, London. It was held from 5 to 9 August. There were 16 boats (80 competitors) from 16 nations, with each nation limited to a single boat in the event. The event was won by the United States, the nation's first victory in the men's coxed four. Switzerland earned silver, the nation's fifth medal in the event in six Games (having missed the podium only in 1932, when no Swiss team competed). Denmark took its first medal in the men's coxed four since 1912, with bronze.

Background

This was the eighth appearance of the event. Rowing had been on the programme in 1896 but was cancelled due to bad weather. The coxed four was one of the four initial events introduced in 1900. It was not held in 1904 or 1908, but was held at every Games from 1912 to 1992 when it (along with the men's coxed pair) was replaced with the men's lightweight double sculls and men's lightweight coxless four.

Seven of the 16 nations from the 1936 Games returned, including silver medalist Switzerland and bronze medalist France. The two-time reigning champions were Germany, not invited to the 1948 Games following World War II and thus unable to defend their title. The favourites were France and Italy, the winners and runners-up of the 1947 European championship.

Argentina, Australia, Cuba, Greece, and Portugal each made their debut in the event. France and the United States both made their sixth appearance, tied for most among nations to that point.

Competition format

The coxed four event featured five-person boats, with four rowers and a coxswain. It was a sweep rowing event, with the rowers each having one oar (and thus each rowing on one side). The venue, Henley-on-Thames, imposed certain restrictions and modifications to the format. The course could handle only three boats at a time (and this required expansion of the typical Henley course), so the six-boat final introduced in 1936 was not possible this time. The course distance was also modified; instead of either the 2000 metres distance that was standard for the Olympics or the 1 mile 550 yards (2112 metres) standard at Henley, a course that was somewhat shorter than either was used. Sources disagree on the exact distance: 1929 metres is listed by the Official Report, though other sources say 1850 metres.

 Round 1: Eight heats, with 2 boats each. The winner of each advanced to the quarterfinals; the loser went to the repechage.
 Repechage: Four heats, with 2 boats each. The winner of each advanced to the quarterfinals; the loser was eliminated.
 Quarterfinals: Six heats, with 2 boats each. The winner of each advanced to the semifinals; the loser was eliminated.
 Semifinals: Three heats, with 2 boats each. The winner of each advanced to the final; the loser was eliminated.
 Final: A single final, with 3 boats.

Schedule

All times are British Summer Time (UTC+1)

Results

Round 1

Heat 1

Heat 2

Heat 3

Heat 4

Heat 5

Heat 6

Heat 7

Heat 8

Repechage

Repechage heat 1

Repechage heat 2

Repechage heat 3

Repechage heat 4

Quarterfinals

Quarterfinal 1

Quarterfinal 2

Quarterfinal 3

Quarterfinal 4

Quarterfinal 5

Quarterfinal 6

Semifinals

Semifinal 1

Semifinal 2

Semifinal 3

Final

References

External links
 Official Olympic Report

Rowing at the 1948 Summer Olympics